Rebecca Hatch, known by her stage name Becca Hatch, is an Australian musician and singer-songwriter from Sydney, Australia. She signed to "Forever Ever Records", a joint venture label between Australian hip hop host Hau Latukefu and Sony Music Australia. in February 2021.

Hatch was the winner of Triple J’s Unearthed High Indigenous Initiative in 2017. She performed a cover version of John Farnham's "Burn for You" for Triple J's Like a Version. Her song "Please U" (feat. Planet Vegeta) received full rotation on Triple J.

In March 2023, Hatch united with Kian on the single "All of Me".

Discography

Singles

Awards and nominations

APRA Awards
The APRA Awards are held in Australia and New Zealand by the Australasian Performing Right Association to recognise songwriting skills, sales and airplay performance by its members annually.

! 
|-
| rowspan="2"| 2022
| "2560" by Becca Hatch
| Most Performed R&B / Soul Work
| 
| 
|-
| "Please U"  (featuring Planet Vegeta)
| Most Performed R&B / Soul Work
| 
| 
|}

References

21st-century Australian women singers
Living people
Year of birth missing (living people)
21st-century Australian singers
Singers from Sydney